Atu'u is a village on Tutuila Island, American Samoa. It is located on the coast of Pago Pago Harbor, close to the capital, Pago Pago.

Atu'u is the location of two tuna canneries, the main employers in American Samoa.

According to business license records from the Government of American Samoa, the village of Atuu is home to 28 commercial businesses. Most of these are fast-food restaurants, eateries, night clubs, bars, and retail shops. The village is also home to a medical clinic, a laundromat, a consultant organization, and a fish agent. A portion of the StarKist Tuna complex is also located in Atuu.

Traditional leaders in Atu'u imposed a nightly curfew in 2002 to combat social problems due to the number of nightclubs.

Demographics

References

Villages in American Samoa